Onykia is a genus of squids in the family Onychoteuthidae. Due to similarities between the genera, several recent authors consider the genus Moroteuthis a junior synonym of Onykia. The type species is Onykia carriboea, the tropical clubhook squid.

Species
The following are the valid species currently recognised as members of the genus Onkyia bu the World Register of Marine Species:Onykia aequatorialis (Thiele, 1920)Onykia carriboea Lesueur, 1821Onykia indica Okutani, 1981Onykia ingens (E. A. Smith, 1881)Onykia loennbergii (Ishikawa & Wakiya, 1914)Onykia robsoni (Adam, 1962)Onykia robusta'' (Verrill, 1876)

References

External links
 Tree of Life web project: Onykia

Squid
Cephalopod genera